Girls Can Play is a 1937 American drama film, directed by Lambert Hillyer. It stars Julie Bishop, Charles Quigley, and Rita Hayworth.

Plot
Softball player Ann Casey is tired of wearing athletic clothing and seeking something more glamorous, so she answers a newspaper ad seeking models at a photography studio. A reporter, Jimmy Jones, distracts her while in line and inadvertently costs Ann the job.

While she returns to playing softball, Jimmy thinks there might be a story in the team. He finds its owner is a gangster, Foy Harris, then stumbles into a diabolical murder plot involving Foy being  disguised as a woman on the team. Foy first kills his partner, then, because she knows too much, murders player Sue Collins by poisoning the laces of her catcher's mitt.

Ann ends up hiding in Foy's closet, in danger of her life, then used as a hostage before Jimmy arrives to save her, just in time.

Cast
 Julie Bishop as Ann Casey (billed as Jacqueline Wells)
 Rita Hayworth as Sue Collins
 Charles Quigley as Jimmy Jones
 John Gallaudet as Foy Harris
 Patricia Farr as Peanuts O'Malley

References

External links
Girls Can Play at the Internet Movie Database

1937 films
American drama films
1937 drama films
Films directed by Lambert Hillyer
American black-and-white films
Columbia Pictures films
1930s American films